USCGC Sea Fox was the last  coastal patrol boat to be built. Her home port is Bangor, Washington.

Unlike most cutters in her class she is owned by the United States Navy, although she is staffed by United States Coast Guard personnel. She and her sister ship,  are employed to protect the Navy's largest submarines, the nuclear-armed , while in and near their moorings in Puget Sound.  and  guard the submarine base in Kings Bay, Georgia.  These four vessels mount an additional gyro-stabilized remotely controlled machine gun.

References

External links

Ships of the United States Coast Guard
Patrol vessels of the United States
Marine Protector-class coastal patrol boats
Seattle
Ships built in Lockport, Louisiana
2009 ships